"No More Tears" is the fifth song and title track on the 1991 Ozzy Osbourne album of the same name. With a running time of 7:23, it is the longest solo song that Osbourne has ever recorded on a studio album. It reached number five on the U.S. Mainstream Rock Tracks chart, number 71 on the Billboard Hot 100, number 17 on the Dutch Top 40 chart and number 32 on the UK Singles Chart.

Overview
The song originated from a jam session, according to guitarist Zakk Wylde: "We were just messing around in rehearsals. Mike started jamming that on the bass, then Randy started playing drums, and then John started doing that keyboard bit." Osbourne considers this song to be "a gift from God", as stated in the Prince of Darkness liner notes.

A shorter edited version of this song was released to some radio stations, and can be heard on the 1997 compilation album The Ozzman Cometh. The full-length version appears on The Essential Ozzy Osbourne.

Theme
In the 2002 remaster booklet for the No More Tears album, Osbourne stated that the song was about a serial killer.

In the September 27, 2018 issue of Weekly Alibi, while texting with music critic August March, Osbourne claimed he wrote the song while in Albuquerque, New Mexico.

Music video
The video consists of Osbourne singing alone at times and with his backing band at others, intercut with footage of a woman entering a room, sitting in a chair, and crying until she is completely submerged in her own tears. The video was shot to accommodate both the album version and the edited version of the song. Some channels played the full-length video, and others played the shortened version. Osbourne's daughter Kelly is seen at the end of the video in an angel costume lip-syncing the words at the end of the song, "It's just a hand in the bush," which repeats until the video fades out.

Critical reception
Richard Gilliam of AllMusic wrote "the song has precisely the sort of hard, rhythmic drive that marks good heavy metal" and "Osbourne’s sharply edged vocals are among the strongest of his solo efforts" but "near the end of the song there’s a pointlessly overproduced art-rock bridge that mars the song’s otherwise fine dynamic flow."

Consequence of Sound called it, "a successful song indebted to both glam metal and prog rock released the same year as Nirvana’s Nevermind", and ranked it as the best song on the album, with "Mama I'm Coming Home", as "a close second."

Cover version
The song was redone by guitarist Zakk Wylde as a bonus track on the second reissue of the Black Label Society album Sonic Brew as well as on its own promotional E.P. called No More Tears.

Releases
 7" single, 1991, Epic Associated Records. Additional track is "S.I.N." Catalog #35-73973 for US.
 7" single, 1991, Epic/Sony. Additional track is "S.I.N." Not available in the US.
 CD single, 1991, Epic/Sony. Special UK package. CD single in an embossed CD wallet with room for each solo studio record. Each sleeve has a different picture. Additional tracks are "S.I.N." and "Party with the Animals".
 CD single, 1991, Epic/Sony. Promo only version, one track.
 12" picture disc, 1991, Epic/Sony. Additional tracks are "S.I.N." and "Party with the Animals". Not available in the US.
 CD single, 1991, Epic/Sony. "Maxi single" with "No More Tears", "S.I.N.", "Don't Blame Me", and "Party with the Animals".

Personnel
Ozzy Osbourne – vocals
Zakk Wylde – guitars, slide guitar
Bob Daisley – bass
John Sinclair – keyboards, piano
Randy Castillo – drums

Certifications

References 

1991 songs
1991 singles
Epic Records singles
Ozzy Osbourne songs
British progressive rock songs
Songs written by Ozzy Osbourne
Songs written by Mike Inez
Songs written by Zakk Wylde
Songs written by Randy Castillo